International Plaza may refer to:

 International Plaza (Pennsylvania). formerly known as Scott Plaza, an office complex in Tinicum Township, Delaware County, Pennsylvania
 International Plaza (Singapore), a commercial and residential building in Singapore
 International Plaza and Bay Street, a shopping mall in Tampa, Florida

Buildings and structures disambiguation pages